The Papists Act 1742 (16 Geo. 2, c. 32) was an Act of Parliament passed by the Parliament of Great Britain during the reign of George II. Its long title was "An Act for allowing further time for inrolment of deeds and wills made by papists; and for relief of protestant purchasers, devisees, and lessees".

Notes

Great Britain Acts of Parliament 1742